Bannister is a locality in the Upper Lachlan Shire, New South Wales, Australia. It lies about 20 km south of Crookwell and 90 km northeast of Canberra.

Bannister was named after Saxe Bannister, first Attorney General of New South Wales. It had a state school from 1878 to 1968. This was described at different times as a "public school", a "half-time school" or a "provisional school". Prior to May 1915, it was called Gullen Flat Public School.

References

Upper Lachlan Shire
Localities in New South Wales
Southern Tablelands